Mohanpur State was a small princely state belonging to the Mahi Kantha Agency of the Bombay Presidency during the era of the British Raj. It was centered on Mohanpur town, in present-day Sabarkantha district of Gujarat State, and included 52 villages.

History 
A predecessor state was founded around 1227 by an ancestor of the later kings named Thakore Jaspal, but its history is obscure.

Although small in size, Mohanpur was not one of the small states that were merged with Baroda State under the Attachment Scheme in December 1943.

The last ruler was Vinaysinhji Sartansinhji who was born in 1909 and rose to the throne in 1927.  He married and had issue. Thakur Vinaysinhji Sartansinhji signed the instrument of accession to the Dominion of India on 10 June 1948. He died on 9 December 1955.

Rulers
The rulers of Mohanpur State bore the title Thakur.

1793 – 1795                Vacant
1795 – 1801                Hindusinhji Pratapsinhji
1801 – 18..                Salamsinhji
18.. – 1850                Raisinhji
1850 – 1875                Dolatsinhji
1875 – 1882                Umedsinhji                      (b. 1854 – d. 1882)
 6 Oct 1882 – 1916         Himmatsinhji                    (b. 1873 – d. 1916)
1882 – 1894                .... -Regent
1916 – 1927                Thakhatsinhji                   (b. 1861 – d. 19..)
1927 – 1947                Vinaysinhji Sartansinhji        (b. 1909 – d. 1955)

See also
List of Rajput dynasties and states
Baroda and Gujarat States Agency
Political integration of India

References

Sabarkantha district
Princely states of Gujarat
States and territories established in 1227
1943 disestablishments in India
Rajputs